The Dutch Eerste Divisie in the 1972–73 season was contested by 20 teams, one less than in the previous year. This was due to the merger of Blauw-Wit Amsterdam with eredivisie-club DWS to form FC Amsterdam. Roda JC won the championship.

It was the first season in which a promotion competition was held. In this promotion competition, four period winners (the best teams during each of the four quarters of the regular competition) played for promotion to the eredivisie.

New entrants
Relegated from the 1971–72 Eredivisie
 Vitesse Arnhem
 FC Volendam
DFC changed their name to FC Dordrecht for this season.

League standings

Promotion competition
In the promotion competition, four period winners (the best teams during each of the four quarters of the regular competition) played for promotion to the Eredivisie.

See also
 1972–73 Eredivisie
 1972–73 KNVB Cup

References

Netherlands - List of final tables (RSSSF)

Eerste Divisie seasons
2
Neth